Lieutenant-General Sir Pratap Singh,  (21 October 1845 – 4 September 1922), was a decorated British Indian Army officer, Maharaja of the princely state of Idar (Gujarat), administrator and Regent of Jodhpur and heir to Ahmednagar later renamed as Himmatnagar from 1902 to 1911.

Early life

Singh was born on 22 October 1845 in Rajput family. He was the third son of Takht Singh of Jodhpur (1819–13 February 1873) the Maharaja of Jodhpur, and his first wife, Gulab Kunwarji Maji. He was educated privately, and little is known of his early life. He received administrative training under Maharaja Ram Singh of Jaipur.

Administrator and Regent

After his father's death in 1873, his eldest brother Maharaja Jaswant Singh succeeded to the throne of Jodhpur. Maharaja Jaswant Singh invited by Pratap Singh to lead Jodhpur state administration.  From 1878 to 1895, Singh served as Chief Minister for Jodhpur.  After his brother's death in 1895, he served as regent for his fifteen-year-old nephew and heir to the Jodhpur throne Sardar Singh of Jodhpur until 1898, then again for his grandnephew Sumer Singh of Jodhpur from 1911 to 1918 and finally for his second grandnephew Umaid Singh from 1918 until his own death in 1922. In total, Pratap Singh had served four rulers of Jodhpur for over four decades. Following the death of the ruler of Idar in 1901, Pratap Singh was Maharajah of that state from 1902 until he resigned in favor of his adopted son in 1911 to return to Jodhpur to be regent. He travelled to Europe often and was close to Queen Victoria and her family, serving as aide-de-camp to Edward VII from 1887 to 1910. He was especially close towards his son, the future George V of the United Kingdom.

Soldier of the Empire

Commissioned in the Jodhpur Risala in 1878, Singh served during the Second Afghan War and was mentioned in dispatches. He was promoted to Lieutenant-Colonel in 1887, served under General Ellis in 1897 and served in the Tirah Campaign in 1898 under General William Lockhart, during which he was wounded. Promoted to an Honorary Colonel the same year, he commanded the Jodhpur contingent during the Boxer Rebellion and was promoted to an Honorary Knight Commander of the Order of the Bath (KCB). In late 1901 he accepted the post of honorary commandant of the Imperial Cadet Corps under Lord Curzon, and was promoted to the honorary rank of Major-General on 9 August 1902. He attended the 1903 Delhi Durbar as an Aide-de-Camp to the Emperor, riding as part of the Viceroy′s main entourage. 

Even as an elderly man of 70, Sir Pratap commanded his regiments during the First World War in France and Flanders from 1914 to 1915 and in the Palestine Mandate at Haifa and Aleppo. He led the Jodhpur Lancers, a cavalry unit, in France. He was promoted to Lieutenant-General in 1916.

Later years

In 1911, Pratap abdicated the gadi (throne) of Idar in favour of his adopted son and nephew, Daulat Singh. Following his wartime service and a final stint as Regent of Jodhpur, Singh died at Jodhpur on 4 September 1922.

Honours

(ribbon bar, as it would look today)

Singh's honours included:

Empress of India Gold Medal, 1877
Mentioned in Dispatches (MID), 1878
Afghanistan Medal, 1878
Queen Victoria Golden Jubilee Medal 1887, with Diamond Jubilee bar, 1897
Mentioned in Dispatches (MID) 1897
Knight Grand Commander of the Order of the Star of India (GCSI), 1897; KCSI, 1886; CSI, 1878
India Medal w/Clasp, 1898
Kaisar-i-Hind Medal 1st Class, 1900
China War Medal,  1901 (He received the medal in person by King Edward VII during an audience in June 1902, when he visited London to attend the King's coronation)
King Edward VII Coronation Medal, 1902, with Delhi Durbar Clasp, 1903
 Honorary commandant - Imperial Cadet Corps - 1904
King George V Coronation Medal, 1911, with Delhi Durbar Clasp
Knight Grand Cross of the Royal Victorian Order (GCVO), 1911
1914 Star, 1919
British War Medal,  1919
Allied Victory Medal, 1919
GCB: Honorary Knight Grand Cross of the Order of the Bath, 1918  (KCB, 1900)  (CB, 1898)
KCB(m): Honorary Knight Commander of the Order of the Bath (Military Division) – 29 November 1900 – in recognition of services during the recent operations in China (Boxer Rebellion). He was invested personally by King Edward VII during an audience in June 1902, when he visited London to attend the King's coronation.
Grand Cordon of the Order of the Nile of Egypt, 1918
Grand Officer of the Legion d'Honneur, 1918
Jodhpur Great War Medal, 1919
Grand Cross of the Order of the Star of Romania, 1921

Titles

1845-1873: Maharajkumar Shri Pratap Singh Sahib
1873-1878: Maharaj Shri Pratap Singh Sahib
1878-1886: Second Lieutenant Maharaj Shri Pratap Singh Sahib, CSI
1886-1887: Second Lieutenant Maharaj Shri Sir Pratap Singh Sahib, KCSI
1887-1897: Lieutenant-Colonel Maharaj Shri Sir Pratap Singh Sahib, KCSI
1897-1898: Lieutenant-Colonel Maharaj Shri Sir Pratap Singh Sahib, GCSI
1898-1901: Colonel Maharaj Shri Sir Pratap Singh Sahib, GCSI, CB
1901-1902: Colonel Maharaj Shri Sir Pratap Singh Sahib, GCSI, KCB
1902-1911: Major-General His Highness Maharajadhiraja Maharaja Shri Sir Pratap Singh Sahib Bahadur, Maharaja of Idar, GCSI, KCB
1911-1916: Major-General His Highness Maharajadhiraja Maharaja Shri Sir Pratap Singh Sahib Bahadur, GCSI, GCVO, KCB
1916-1918: Lieutenant-General His Highness Maharajadhiraja Maharaja Shri Sir Pratap Singh Sahib Bahadur, GCSI, GCVO, KCB
1918-1922: Lieutenant-General His Highness Maharajadhiraja Maharaja Shri Sir Pratap Singh Sahib Bahadur, GCB, GCSI, GCVO

References

External links

British Indian Army generals
People from Jodhpur
Honorary Knights Grand Cross of the Order of the Bath
Knights Grand Commander of the Order of the Star of India
Indian Knights Grand Cross of the Royal Victorian Order
Recipients of the Kaisar-i-Hind Medal
Grand Officiers of the Légion d'honneur
Grand Crosses of the Order of the Star of Romania
19th-century Indian royalty
Rajasthani people
1845 births
1922 deaths
Rathores
British military personnel of the Second Anglo-Afghan War
British military personnel of the Tirah campaign
British military personnel of the Boxer Rebellion
Pratap
Monarchs who abdicated
Indian Army personnel of World War I